Liu Yu (Pinyin: Liú Yǔ; born May 12, 1985 in Chengdu, Sichuan) is a Chinese football player who currently plays for Chengdu Better City as a defender.

Club career 

Liu Yu started his professional football career in 2004 with top tier club Sichuan First City when he made his league debut against Beijing Guoan on March 16, 2004 in a 1–1 draw in Sichuan's first game of the season. He would quickly establish himself as Sichuan's first choice left-back and would feature in sixteen league games throughout the season. By the next season he would continue to be a prominent member of the team, however he found himself without a club at the beginning of the 2006 Chinese Super League when Sichuan Guancheng disbanded.

Without a club Liu Yu would move to reigning league champions Dalian Shide where he would make his league debut against Liaoning F.C. on March 18, 2006 in a 2–0 win. Once again he would quickly establish himself within the team and become their first choice left-back and make twenty league appearances in his debut season. By the next season Zhai Yanpeng regained his place as Dalian's left-back and Liu Yu was allowed to leave by the end of the season. This saw Liu Yu join fellow Chinese Super League team Henan Construction and while he was a regular throughout the season he only remained with them for one season before joining Chengdu Blades at the beginning of the 2009 Chinese Super League season.

At Chengdu, he immediately established himself as the club's first choice fullback and helped guide the team to mid-table safety in his first season; however, despite that, the club were relegated to the second tier when it was discovered that they fixed several games in 2007 to help them in their process for promotion to the top tier. Liu Yu decided to remain faithful towards the club and continued to be a vital member of the team, where he scored his first goal against Anhui Jiufang on September 11, 2010 in a league game that Chengdu won 4–0. By the end of the league campaign, Liu guided the club to second in the league and immediate promotion back into the Chinese Super League.

In Jun 2011, Liu Yu signed a two and half years contract with Chinese Super League team Jiangsu Sainty with a transfer fee of ￥500,000 (about $77,000 according to then exchange rate).
In January 2012, Liu transferred to Super League newcomer Dalian Aerbin with a fee of ￥ 3 million.
Liu transferred to another China League One club Chongqing Lifan in January 2014.

On 27 February 2019, Liu transferred to his hometown club Chengdu Better City in the China League Two. He would go on to win promotion with the club as they came runners-up at the end of the 2019 China League Two season. He would continue to help guide the team to another promotion at the end of the 2021 league campaign.

International career
Liu Yu would be called-up to the Chinese national team for the first time when the Chinese Head coach Gao Hongbo included him in a friendly On March 29, 2011 against Honduras and would aid China to a 3–0 victory.

Career Statistics 
Statistics accurate as of match played 31 December 2021.

Honours

Club
Chongqing Lifan
China League One: 2014

References

External links
 Player stats at Football-lineups.com
 
 
 Player stats at Sohu.com

1985 births
Living people
Sportspeople from Chengdu
Chinese footballers
China international footballers
Footballers from Sichuan
Sichuan Guancheng players
Chengdu Tiancheng F.C. players
Henan Songshan Longmen F.C. players
Dalian Shide F.C. players
Jiangsu F.C. players
Dalian Professional F.C. players
Chongqing Liangjiang Athletic F.C. players
Chengdu Better City F.C. players
Chinese Super League players
China League One players
China League Two players
Footballers at the 2006 Asian Games
Association football defenders
Asian Games competitors for China